Blagovar is a rural locality (a selo) and the administrative centre of Blagovarsky Selsoviet, Blagovarsky District, Bashkortostan, Russia. The population was 2,061 as of 2010. There are 22 streets.

Geography 
Blagovar is located 14 km southwest of Yazykovo (the district's administrative centre) by road. Kamyshly is the nearest rural locality.

References 

Rural localities in Blagovarsky District